Bautista (Spanish for "baptist") is a Spanish language surname also used as a first name, often in reference to John the Baptist. Notable people with the surname include:

Adolfo Bautista (born 1979), Mexican footballer
Alba Bautista (born 2002), Spanish rhythmic gymnast 
Alberto Bautista Gómez, Mexican potter
Álvaro Bautista (born 1984), Spanish motorcyclist
Andres D. Bautista, Filipino lawyer
Antonio Bautista (1937–1974), Philippine Air Force pilot
Arianne Bautista (born 1993), Filipino actress and model
Aring Bautista, Filipino actress
Augusto Bautista, Filipino basketball player
Aurora Bautista (1925–2012), Spanish actress
Boyet Bautista (born 1981), Filipino basketball player
Buda Bautista (born 1973), Filipino women's footballer and manager
Cacai Bautista (born 1978), Filipino actress and comedian
Cipriano Bautista (died 2000), Filipino politician
Cirilo Bautista (1941–2018), Filipino poet and writer
Christian Bautista (born 1981), Filipino singer, actor, host and model
Christian Javier Bautista (born 1987), Salvadoran footballer
Daniel Bautista (born 1952), Mexican racewalker
Daniel Bautista Pina (born 1981), Spanish footballer
Danny Bautista (born 1972), Dominican Republic baseball player
Dave Bautista (born 1969), American professional wrestler and actor better known under the ring name Batista
Denny Bautista (born 1980), Dominican Republic baseball player
Diana Bautista, American neuroscientist
Diego Bautista Urbaneja (1782–1856), Venezuelan politician
Emilio Bautista (1898–1977), Spanish boxer
Emmanuel T. Bautista (born 1958), Filipino general
Enrique Bautista (1934–2005), Filipino sprinter
Félix Bautista (born 1963), Dominican Republic politician
Félix Bautista (born 1995), Dominican baseball player
Francisco Bautista (born 1972), Mexican long-distance runner
Francisco 'Paco' Bautista (born 1971), Spanish bodybuilder
Franklin Bautista (born 1952), Filipino politician
Gloria Bautista Cuevas (born 1953), Mexican politician
Guadalupe Bautista (born 1988), Mexican professional boxer
Harlene Bautista, Filipino actress
Harvey Bautista (born 2003), Filipino actor
Herbert Bautista (born 1968), Filipino actor and politician
Hermes Bautista (born 1986), Filipino-American actor
Herminio Bautista (1940–2017), Filipino actor
Jayann Bautista (born 1986), Filipino singer
Jerónimo Bautista Lanuza (1533–1624), Spanish Dominican friar, bishop and writer
Jon Bautista (born 1995), Spanish footballer
José Bautista (pitcher) (born 1964), Major League Baseball pitcher
José Bautista (born 1980), Major League Baseball right fielder and third baseman
José Fernando Bautista Quintero, Colombian lawyer and politician
Julián Bautista (1901–1961), Spanish composer and conductor
Leanne Bautista (born 2010), Filipino child actress
Lualhati Bautista (1945–2023), Filipino writer
Maey Bautista (born 1972), Filipino journalist, actress and comedian
Marcelina Bautista (born 1966), Mexican human rights activist
Margarito Bautista (1878–1961), Nahua-Mexican missionary, theologian and religious founder
Mark Bautista (born 1983), Filipino singer and actor
Perla Bautista (born 1940), Filipino actress
Rafael Bautista (born 1965), Mexican footballer and manager
Rafael Bautista (baseball) (born 1993), Dominican Republic baseball player
Ramon Bautista (born 1986), Filipino actor and comedian
Reynaldo Bautista (born 1986), Filipino professional boxer
Roberto Bautista Agut (born 1988), Spanish tennis player
Roland Bautista (1951–2012), American musician
Sheree Bautista, Filipino actress, dancer and model
Víctor Manuel Bautista López (born 1947), Mexican politician
Yudelkys Bautista (born 1974), Dominican Republic volleyball player

Spanish-language surnames
Surnames of Filipino origin